Gymnocladus burmanicus or Dekang tree is a tree in the subfamily Caesalpinioideae of the pea family Fabaceae, native to India.

References

Caesalpinioideae
Flora of India (region)